John Joseph O'Neill (born 3 January 1974) is a Scottish footballer, who played as a midfielder.

O'Neill started his career with amateur club Queen's Park, before signing for Celtic in 1994. In his career, he had two spells of playing for Dumfries club Queen of the South. While he was with Queens, O'Neill won the 2001–02 Scottish Second Division and he was the club's top scorer and won the divisional player of the year title. O'Neill scored in the 2002 Scottish Challenge Cup Final victory against Brechin City. O'Neill also made a substitute appearance for Queens in the 2008 Scottish Cup Final against Rangers, which turned out to be his last appearance for the club. He was also a penalty kick specialist at Queens, scoring 27 goals from 29 attempts. In total he scored 70 goals for Queens in competitive first team fixtures.

In the summer of 2008 O'Neill signed for Stirling Albion as a player and was also appointed assistant manager. After manager Allan Moore left for Morton, O'Neill was appointed the new manager of Stirling Albion in May 2010. After winning only three league matches in the 2010–11 season, however, O'Neill was sacked in January 2011. After leaving the Binos, O'Neill played for Auchinleck Talbot.

References

External links 

1974 births
Living people
Footballers from Glasgow
Scottish footballers
Association football midfielders
Queen's Park F.C. players
Celtic F.C. players
AFC Bournemouth players
Queen of the South F.C. players
Ross County F.C. players
St Mirren F.C. players
Stirling Albion F.C. players
Scottish Football League players
English Football League players
Scottish football managers
Stirling Albion F.C. managers
Scottish Junior Football Association players
Auchinleck Talbot F.C. players
Scottish Football League managers